Mario Varglien (26 December 1905 – 11 August 1978), also known as Varglien I, was an Italian football player and manager born in Fiume (today Rijeka), who played as a midfielder.

Club career
Varglien played club football with Juventus for most of his career, winning five Serie A championships, and also serving as the team's captain.

International career
At international level, Varglien was also part of the Italy national football team which won the 1934 FIFA World Cup.

Personal life
Mario's brother, Giovanni Varglien also played football in Italy and with the Italy national team; the two brothers played together at Juventus.

Honours

Player

Club
Juventus
Serie A: 1930–31, 1931–32, 1932–33, 1933–34, 1934–35 
Coppa Italia: 1937–38, 1941–42

International
Italy
FIFA World Cup: 1934

Coach

Club
Como
Serie B: 1948–49

References

1905 births
1978 deaths
Italian footballers
Italy international footballers
Italian Austro-Hungarians
Juventus F.C. players
1934 FIFA World Cup players
FIFA World Cup-winning players
Italian football managers
U.S. Triestina Calcio 1918 managers
Como 1907 managers
A.S. Roma managers
U.S. Triestina Calcio 1918 players
Serie A players
Footballers from Rijeka
People from Rijeka
Aurora Pro Patria 1919 players
U.S. Fiumana players
HNK Rijeka players

Association football midfielders